Ivan Werner (18 June 1887 – 26 June 1944) was a Croatian politician in the Kingdom of Yugoslavia and the Independent State of Croatia who served as the mayor of Zagreb from 1941 to 1944. A member of the fascist Ustaše party, Werner is best known for ordering the demolition of the Zagreb Synagogue in 1941 and for collaborating and cooperating with the Nazis during the Holocaust.

A butcher by trade, Werner was an expert on food processing and logistics. Werner died on June 26, 1944 and is buried in Mirogoj Cemetery.

References

1887 births
1944 deaths
Mayors of Zagreb
Burials at Mirogoj Cemetery
Ustaše